The Bell Bay Line is a freight rail corridor connecting the port of Bell Bay to the main rail network of Tasmania. The Railway Line was built in 1973 to connect the Longreach sawmill to the rail network, and was extended to Bell Bay in 1974.

Traffic on the line was initially limited to woodchip logs to Longreach, with the occasional train to George Town and Bell Bay. By the 1990s, log traffic to Longreach by rail was decreasing, and container traffic to the port of Bell Bay was increasing. Today the only traffic on the line is containers to and from Bell Bay. At present, the railway line is included in the Federal Government's AusLink initiative

See also
Rail transport in Tasmania

References

Railway lines in Tasmania
Railway lines opened in 1973
3 ft 6 in gauge railways in Australia
1973 establishments in Australia